Chmielówka may refer to the following villages in north-east Poland:
 Chmielówka, Podlaskie Voivodeship
 Chmielówka, Braniewo County (Warmian-Masurian Voivodeship)
 Chmielówka, Olsztyn County  (Warmian-Masurian Voivodeship)